The Gilbert Stuart Birthplace and Museum is located in Saunderstown, Rhode Island. Gilbert Stuart was born on December 3, 1755, in the colonial-era house located on the property, becoming a famous American portraitist of the 18th and 19th centuries. The museum consists of the 1750 house in which Stuart was born, an operational snuff mill, an operational grist mill, a mill pond, streams, a fish ladder, nature trails, an herb garden, and a welcome center and art gallery.

History 

The house on the property was built in 1751, and Gilbert Stuart lived there for six years. His father operated the family business in the basement of the house, where a water-powered snuff mill was located. He ground dried tobacco leaves into snuff, a fine powder used widely in the colonial era, and his was actually the first such mill in America. When Stuart was six years old, his family moved to Newport, Rhode Island.

The house served as a private residence and a tavern during the 18th century, and the snuff mill and water wheel were lost. In 1930, the building was restored to its colonial state by Norman Isham and was opened to the public as a museum in 1931. Many of the house's original wood beams remained intact. It also retained its original four corner fireplaces, one in each room in the house. An English snuff mill built in the early 1730s was transported to the property during the restoration, and it is considered faithful in design to the original snuff mill. In addition, a new water wheel was built and attached to the side of the house, allowing the mill to operate by water power from Mattatuxet Brook. An original colonial-era gristmill was built in 1757 and owned by Benjamin Hammond, fitted with a water wheel. The mill remained inoperable until 2007, when the waterwheel was reconnected to the mill's operating gears.

The site was designated a National Historic Landmark in 1965 and was added to the National Register of Historic Places in 1966.

Museum 

The Gilbert Stuart Birthplace operates guided tours of the birthplace and gristmill Thursday through Monday, and is open from May until mid-October. The house is furnished with original colonial furnishings in every room, though no piece of furniture is original to the house. Each room is also fitted with reproductions of Gilbert Stuart's most famous works, including the famous unfinished Athenaeum Portrait of George Washington (which is portrayed on the one-dollar bill), The Skater, Dr. Hunter's Spaniels, John Jay, and Catherine Brass Yates. Tours of the museum focus on the operation of the mills, explanation of the fish ladder, talks about the life and artwork of Gilbert Stuart, as well as some descriptions of the colonial furnishings and objects.

Junior docents 
The Gilbert Stuart Birthplace operates a unique junior docent program, in which children and adolescents can volunteer to give interpretive tours of the museum dressed in colonial attire. The program is designed to teach children about history and the workings of a museum. Junior docents conduct tours on Sunday afternoons.

Grounds 
The Gilbert Stuart Birthplace is located on twenty-three acres of property. The museum features nature trails, which bring tourists to the site of an old colonial burial ground, the Benjamin Hammond cemetery, a scenic overlook of Carr Pond, and the foundation of a colonial fulling mill. The grounds also feature an herb garden, a timber dam, and a boat dock, from which rowboats can be rented by museum members for use on nearby Carr Pond.

Images

See also 

Casey Farm
Smith's Castle
List of National Historic Landmarks in Rhode Island
National Register of Historic Places listings in Washington County, Rhode Island

References

External links
Official website
Gilbert Stuart, a full text exhibition catalog from The Metropolitan Museum of Art

Houses completed in 1751
Houses on the National Register of Historic Places in Rhode Island
Museums in Washington County, Rhode Island
History of New England
National Historic Landmarks in Rhode Island
Stuart, Gilbert
Mill museums in the United States
Tobacco buildings in the United States
Art museums and galleries in Rhode Island
Stuart
Houses in Washington County, Rhode Island
Stuart, Gilbert
National Register of Historic Places in Washington County, Rhode Island
1751 establishments in the Thirteen Colonies
Stuart